The Consumer Council for Water (CCWater) is a non-departmental public body whose sponsor department is Defra. CCWater is independent of both the regulator, Ofwat, and the water companies.

CCWater represents the interests of water and sewerage consumers in England and Wales. The organisation provides impartial advice and/or advocacy for aggrieved customers. It has a remit to support both household customers of water companies and business customers of licensed retailers.

There are four regional committees in England (Northern, Central & Eastern, London & South East and Western) and one in Wales. Each committee oversees water companies and licensed retailers in their area. The head office is in Victoria Square House, Victoria Square, Birmingham and a second office is in Cardiff.

In March 2010, CCWater added an online Consumer Support site where users can have their own questions/enquiries answered which can be accessed via its website.

External links

 CCWater

Department for Environment, Food and Rural Affairs
Non-departmental public bodies of the United Kingdom government
Water supply and sanitation in England and Wales